Emily Gerson Saines is an American talent manager and producer.

Biography

Early life
Gerson Saines was born in New York City, New York and graduated from Northwestern University with a degree in Radio/Television/Film.

Career
Gerson Saines began her career as an assistant at Creative Artists Agency and first became an agent at Agency for the Performing Arts.  She went on to become a vice president at the William Morris Agency, where she represented clients such as Angelina Jolie, Scarlett Johansson, and Robert Downey, Jr. In 1998, Gerson Saines left William Morris to form her own talent management company, Gerson Saines Management.  The company would later become Brookside Artist Management, where her clients now include Sebastian Stan, Daveed Diggs, Ansel Elgort, Kieran Culkin, Macaulay Culkin, Cynthia Nixon, Ashley Park, Maria Bakalova, Grace Van Patten, Anson Mount, Eric Bogosian, Steven Pasquale, Alex Brightman, Mekhi Phifer, Sophia Anne Caruso, and yasiin bey (formerly known as Mos Def).

Gerson Saines made her producing debut with the television film The Courage to Love, starring Vanessa Williams, and executive produced Foster Hall for NBC with Conan O'Brien.

In 2010, she served as executive producer for the HBO film Temple Grandin starring Claire Danes, David Strathairn, Catherine O'Hara, and Julia Ormond. Temple Grandin aired February 2010 and received seven Emmy Awards including Outstanding Made for Television Movie. Temple Grandin also received three Golden Globe Award nominations, a Peabody Award, an American Film Institute AFI Award, the Princess Grace AMADE medal at the Monte Carlo Television Festival, an International Press Academy Satellite Award, the US Department of Health & Human Services Voice Award, a 2010 WIN Award, A Producers Guild of America Award Nomination, a Los Angeles Times Gold Derby TV Award nomination, a Critics' Choice Award Nomination, a Television Critics Association Award nomination, and the 2010 Humanitas Prize. A.O. Scott of The New York Times also named Temple Grandin the best biopic and one of the best films of 2010.

Gerson Saines' producing projects include the critically acclaimed HBO Max television series Tokyo Vice, written by J.T. Rogers and directed by Michael Mann as well as the Starz television spin-off of Blindspotting, co-written by Daveed Diggs and Rafael Casal. Blindspotting was nominated for Short Form Breakthrough Series at the 2021 Gotham Awards and Best New Scripted Series at the 2022 Independent Spirit Awards.

Gerson Saines was featured in the 2017 and 2018 issues of Variety's Women Impact Report, and previously was also featured in Moves Magazine Power Women Issue. She is the recipient of the Academy of Television Arts and Sciences Frank O'Connor Memorial Award for her work in the field of music videos and is the author of Acting: The Guide to Chicago.  She is on the advisory board of her alma mater Northwestern University's School of Communication and in 2014 was the Northwestern School of Communication's commencement speaker. Previously, she was the commencement speaker at Columbia University's Department of Occupational Therapy.  She has been honored by the HollyRod Foundation and the LifeSpire Foundation.  She is a member of the Academy of Television Arts and Sciences, the Producers Guild of America, BAFTA, and has lectured and participated in panels before the American Bar Association, Harvard University, Columbia University, and Northwestern University.

References

External links
 

Talent managers
Living people
Businesspeople from New York City
Northwestern University School of Communication alumni
Film producers from New York (state)
American talent agents
Year of birth missing (living people)
Primetime Emmy Award winners